This is a list of football clubs that play in the four levels of the Hong Kong football league system. Most clubs are located in Hong Kong, though there are some clubs from outside Hong Kong (for example in mainland China) that play in the Hong Kong system.

By League and Division
 Premier League
 First Division
 Second Division
 Third Division

Alphabetically
The divisions are correct for the 2015–16 season. Most teams competing in the lower division (First Division, Second Division and Third Division) do not have their own home ground. It is denoted by an "N/A" in the "Home Ground" column.



C

D

E

F

H

I

K

L

M

N

O

P

R

S

T

W

Y

Hong Kong
Football clubs